The 4th Curtis Cup Match was played on September 7 and 8, 1938 at the Essex County Club in Manchester-by-the-Sea, Massachusetts. The United States won 5 to 3. Britain had led by 2 points after the foursomes but America won 5 of the 6 singles to win the match.

Format
The contest was played over two days, with three foursomes on the first day and six singles matches on the second day, a total of 9 points. Matches were over 18 holes.

Each of the 9 matches was worth one point in the larger team competition. If a match was all square after the 18th hole extra holes were not played. Rather, each side earned  a point toward their team total. The team that accumulated at least 5 points won the competition.

Teams
Both USA and Great Britain & Ireland selected just 7 players for the event.

The British team was selected in late May, during the Womens Amateur Championship.

Wednesday's foursomes matches

Thursday's singles matches

References

Curtis Cup
Curtis Cup
Curtis Cup
Curtis Cup
Golf in Massachusetts
Events in Essex County, Massachusetts
Manchester-by-the-Sea, Massachusetts
Curtis Cup
Sports competitions in Massachusetts
Sports in Essex County, Massachusetts
Tourist attractions in Essex County, Massachusetts